The kiss cam is a social pastime that takes place during arena, stadium and court sporting events in the United States and Canada. A 'kiss cam' camera scans the crowd, and selects a couple, their images being shown on the jumbotron screens in the arena. 

The kiss cam tradition originated in California in the early 1980s, as a way to fill in the gaps in play in professional baseball games, taking advantage of the possibilities of the then-new giant video screens.

When the kiss cam is in action, the audience may be alerted by a known 'kiss-related' song being played, and/or an announcer warning the crowd. The crowd attending then pay attention to the marked 'kiss cam' video screen. Normally, several consecutive couples are selected, and appear on the screen. As each pair appear onscreen, they are then expected to kiss. Additionally, sporting event staff may appear as couples who reject kisses or proposals in order to entertain or surprise the attending audience.

A kiss is traditionally rewarded by applause, clapping, cheers and whistles, whereas a refusal to kiss is booed.  It is intended as a light-hearted diversion to the main event during a timeout, television timeout, or similar downtime.

The couple focused on by the camera may not be in a romantic relationship. They may in fact be relatives, friends, or strangers. A platonic, perhaps awkward kiss often then results. Sometimes a refusal can generate a humorous twist for those watching.

The kiss cam screen often appears on television if the event is televised. The couple focused on may not wish their attendance together at the event to be widely publicized.

Some couples, although not wishing to kiss, feel intimidated by the crowd reaction, and feel forced to do so. Other instances may find the couple not noticing themselves on the screen, and the resulting inaction can be humorous or embarrassing.

In popular culture
On The Tonight Show with Conan O'Brien, O'Brien parodied the Kiss Cam in comedy sketches, focusing on unlikely couples, such as a hunter and a bear.

The Canadian group, the Arkells released a song titled "Kiss Cam".

The Great Khali once hosted a weekly segment in his wrestling appearances called 'Khali Kiss Cam', in which he would kiss a female supposed audience member. He was preceded in this by the late wrestler Rick Rude, who would kiss a woman selected from the crowd after his victories.

In Family Portrait, the finale of the first season of the US television comedy Modern Family, Phil is caught on a kiss cam, and feigning reluctance kisses Gloria, his step-mother-in-law.

References

1980s establishments in California
Kissing games
North American society
Sports culture